Edward Theodore Link (March 11, 1886 – May 22, 1939), nicknamed "Laddie", was a Major League Baseball pitcher who played for one season. He pitched in 22 games for the Cleveland Naps during the 1910 Cleveland Naps season and three games for the St. Louis Browns during the 1910 St. Louis Browns season.

External links

1886 births
1939 deaths
Major League Baseball pitchers
Cleveland Naps players
St. Louis Browns players
Baseball players from Columbus, Ohio
Newark Cotton Tops players
Newark Newks players
Lima Cigarmakers players
Columbus Senators players
Indianapolis Indians players
Indianapolis Hoosiers (minor league) players